Estriol sulfate, or estriol 3-sulfate, is a conjugated metabolite of estriol that is present in high quantities during pregnancy. It is formed from estriol in the liver and is eventually excreted in the urine by the kidneys. It has much higher water solubility than does estriol. Estriol sulfate is the second most prevalent conjugated metabolite of estriol during pregnancy; 35 to 46% is estriol glucuronide and 15 to 22% is estriol 3-sulfate, while the double conjugate estriol sulfate glucuronide also occurs. Estriol sulfate was a component, along with estriol glucuronide, of the early pharmaceutical estrogens Progynon and Emmenin.

See also
 Catechol estrogen
 Estradiol glucuronide
 Estradiol sulfate
 Estrogen conjugate
 Estrone glucuronide
 Estrone sulfate
 Lipoidal estradiol

References

Estriol esters
Estrogens
Human metabolites
Sulfate esters